Tanyard Bottom, also known as Tech Flats, was a shantytown just south of Georgia Tech along Techwood Drive. It was replaced in the 1930s with the Techwood Homes, America's first public housing project. It is currently the site of Centennial Place Apartments.

References

Former shantytowns and slums in Atlanta